The 2016 Atlantic 10 Conference women's soccer season was the 21st season of women's varsity soccer in the conference.

Changes from 2015 

 None

Teams

Stadia and locations 

 Richmond does not sponsor men's soccer

Regular season

Rankings

Postseason

A10 tournament

NCAA tournament

All-A10 awards and teams

See also 
 2016 NCAA Division I women's soccer season
 2016 Atlantic 10 Women's Soccer Tournament
 2016 Atlantic 10 Conference men's soccer season

References 

 
2016 NCAA Division I women's soccer season